Bura East Airport is an airport in Kenya.

Location
Bura East Airport  is located in the town of Bura, Tana River County, in southeastern Kenya, close to the Indian Ocean coast and to the International border with Somalia.

The geographic coordinates of this airport are:1° 11' 6.00"S, 39° 48' 50.00"E (Latitude: -1.185000; Longitude:39.813890).

Overview
Bura East Airport is a small airport that serves the town of Bura, Tana. At the moment, there is no scheduled airline service to Bura East Airport.

Airlines and destinations
None at the moment.

See also
 Bura, Tana
 Tana River District
 Coast Province
 Kenya Airports Authority
 Kenya Civil Aviation Authority
 List of airports in Kenya

References

External links
  Location of Bura East Airport At Google Maps
  Website of Kenya Airports Authority
  Airkenya Flight Routes

Airports in Kenya
Coast Province
Tana River County